Billy Ward may refer to:

 Billy Ward (singer) (1921–2002), American singer with Billy Ward and His Dominoes
 Billy Ward (boxer) (1993–2013), Australian boxer
 Billy Ward (rugby league) (fl. 1888–1921), English rugby league footballer of the 1900s, 1910s and 1920s